The 2022–23 season is the 120th season in the history of K.A.A. Gent and their 34th consecutive season in the top flight. The club are participating in the Belgian Pro League, Belgian Cup, the UEFA Europa League, and the UEFA Europa Conference League.

Players

Other players under contract

Out on loan

Transfers

In

Out

Pre-season and friendlies

Competitions

Overall record

Pro League

League table

Results summary

Results by round

Matches 
The league fixtures were announced on 22 June 2022.

Belgian Cup

Belgian Super Cup

UEFA Europa League

Play-off round 
The draw for the play-off round was held on 2 August 2022.

UEFA Europa Conference League

Group stage 

The draw for the group stage was held on 26 August 2022.

Knockout round play-off

Round of 16

References

K.A.A. Gent seasons
Gent